Masquerade is a single-movement orchestral composition by the British-born composer Anna Clyne.  The work was commissioned by the BBC and it was first performed on 7 September 2013 at the Last Night of the Proms by the BBC Symphony Orchestra under conductor Marin Alsop.  Clyne dedicated the piece to the Proms' concertgoers colloquially known as the "Prommers".

Composition
Masquerade is composed in a single movement and has a duration of roughly 5 minutes.  The piece is inspired by 18th-century promenade concerts held in London's pleasure garden.  Clyne wrote of this inspiration in the score program notes:
The music quotes the melody from the traditional English drinking song "The Juice of the Barley."

Instrumentation
The work is scored for an orchestra comprising two flutes, piccolo, two oboes, cor anglais, two clarinets, bass clarinet, two bassoons, contrabassoon, four horns, three trumpets, two trombones, bass trombone, tuba, timpani, three percussionists, harp, and strings.

Reception
Reviewing the world premiere, Fiona Maddocks of The Guardian called Masquerade a "short, glistening" piece. Also writing for The Guardian, the music critic Martin Kettle called the piece "an appealingly exuberant curtain-raiser."

References

Compositions by Anna Clyne
2013 compositions
Compositions for symphony orchestra
Music commissioned by the BBC